Logone Oriental is one of the 23 regions of Chad, located in the south-west of the country. Its capital is Doba. It is coterminous with the former Logone Oriental Prefecture.

Geography
The region borders Logone Occidental Region and Tandjilé Region to the north, Mandoul Region to the east, the Central African Republic to the south, and Cameroon to the west.

Settlements
Doba is the regional capital; other major settlements include Baïbokoum, Baké, Béboni, Béboto, Békan, Béssao, Béti, Bodo, Dobiti, Donia, Goré, Komé, Laramanaye, Madana, Mbaïkoro, Mbikou, Mbitoye, Miandoum, Yamodo.

Demography
The 2009 Chadian census reported a population for the region of 779,339. In 1993 the population was 440,342.

The main ethnolinguistic groups are Doba peoples (speaking the closely related Bedjond, Mango and Gor languages), Karang, Kuo, Nzakambay, Pana and Sara groups (speaking language/dialects such as Kabba, Laka and Ngambay).

Economy
Subsistence agriculture, cotton, oil.

Subdivisions
The region of Logone Oriental is divided in six departments:

References

 
Regions of Chad